Bezirk Wels-Land is a district of the state of 
Upper Austria in Austria.

Municipalities 
Towns (Städte) are indicated in boldface; market towns (Marktgemeinden) in italics; suburbs, hamlets and other subdivisions of a municipality are indicated in small characters.
Aichkirchen
Bachmanning
Bad Wimsbach-Neydharting
Buchkirchen
Eberstalzell
Edt bei Lambach
Fischlham
Gunskirchen
Holzhausen
Krenglbach
Lambach
Marchtrenk
Neukirchen bei Lambach
Offenhausen
Pennewang
Pichl bei Wels
Sattledt
Schleißheim
Sipbachzell
Stadl-Paura
Steinerkirchen an der Traun
Steinhaus
Thalheim bei Wels
Weißkirchen an der Traun

External links
bfk-wels-land.at
Flags of the World: Wels-Land

 
Districts of Upper Austria